The Leningradsky Constituency (No.198) is a Russian legislative constituency in Moscow. It is based in Northern Moscow bordering the Leningradskoye Highway.

Members elected

Election results

1993

|-
! colspan=2 style="background-color:#E9E9E9;text-align:left;vertical-align:top;" |Candidate
! style="background-color:#E9E9E9;text-align:left;vertical-align:top;" |Party
! style="background-color:#E9E9E9;text-align:right;" |Votes
! style="background-color:#E9E9E9;text-align:right;" |%
|-
|style="background-color: " |
|align=left|Alla Gerber
|align=left|Independent
|44,977
|18.43%
|-
|style="background-color: " |
|align=left|Vladimir Lysenko
|align=left|Yavlinsky—Boldyrev—Lukin
| -
|17.23%
|-
| colspan="5" style="background-color:#E9E9E9;"|
|- style="font-weight:bold"
| colspan="3" style="text-align:left;" | Total
| 244,037
| 100%
|-
| colspan="5" style="background-color:#E9E9E9;"|
|- style="font-weight:bold"
| colspan="4" |Source:
|
|}

1995

|-
! colspan=2 style="background-color:#E9E9E9;text-align:left;vertical-align:top;" |Candidate
! style="background-color:#E9E9E9;text-align:left;vertical-align:top;" |Party
! style="background-color:#E9E9E9;text-align:right;" |Votes
! style="background-color:#E9E9E9;text-align:right;" |%
|-
|style="background-color: #FE4801" |
|align=left|Vladimir Lysenko
|align=left|Pamfilova–Gurov–Lysenko
|55,133
|18.59%
|-
|style="background-color: " |
|align=left|Vladimir Zhuravlyov
|align=left|Communist Party
|34,442
|11.61%
|-
|style="background-color: " |
|align=left|Alla Yaroshinskaya
|align=left|Independent
|28,630
|9.65%
|-
|style="background-color: #2C299A" |
|align=left|Aleksandr Dondukov
|align=left|Congress of Russian Communities
|26,695
|9.00%
|-
|style="background-color: " |
|align=left|Vyacheslav Ageev
|align=left|Independent
|19,134
|6.45%
|-
|style="background-color: " |
|align=left|Oleg Samarin
|align=left|Independent
|17,517
|5.91%
|-
|style="background-color: " |
|align=left|Vladimir Ivanov
|align=left|Independent
|14,701
|4.96%
|-
|style="background-color: " |
|align=left|Larisa Grigoryeva
|align=left|Environmental Party of Russia "Kedr"
|12,250
|4.13%
|-
|style="background-color: " |
|align=left|Aleksandr Aksanov
|align=left|Independent
|8,094
|2.73%
|-
|style="background-color: #FFF22E" |
|align=left|Dmitry Shestakov
|align=left|Beer Lovers Party
|8,075
|2.72%
|-
|style="background-color: " |
|align=left|Aleksandr Stankevich
|align=left|Independent
|6,453
|2.18%
|-
|style="background-color: #F21A29" |
|align=left|Aleksandr Slavinsky
|align=left|Trade Unions and Industrialists – Union of Labour
|5,882
|1.98%
|-
|style="background-color: " |
|align=left|Eduard Savenko (Limonov)
|align=left|Independent
|5,555
|1.87%
|-
|style="background-color: " |
|align=left|Georgy Lukava
|align=left|Liberal Democratic Party
|4,502
|1.52%
|-
|style="background-color: " |
|align=left|Igor Krugovykh
|align=left|Independent
|3,011
|1.02%
|-
|style="background-color: #A8A821" |
|align=left|Vladimir Moiseev
|align=left|Stable Russia
|2,944
|0.99%
|-
|style="background-color: " |
|align=left|Oleg Vasenin
|align=left|Independent
|2,083
|0.70%
|-
|style="background-color:#000000"|
|colspan=2 |against all
|36,038
|12.15%
|-
| colspan="5" style="background-color:#E9E9E9;"|
|- style="font-weight:bold"
| colspan="3" style="text-align:left;" | Total
| 296,640
| 100%
|-
| colspan="5" style="background-color:#E9E9E9;"|
|- style="font-weight:bold"
| colspan="4" |Source:
|
|}

1999

|-
! colspan=2 style="background-color:#E9E9E9;text-align:left;vertical-align:top;" |Candidate
! style="background-color:#E9E9E9;text-align:left;vertical-align:top;" |Party
! style="background-color:#E9E9E9;text-align:right;" |Votes
! style="background-color:#E9E9E9;text-align:right;" |%
|-
|style="background-color: "|
|align=left|Vladimir Lysenko (incumbent)
|align=left|Independent
|56,396
|19.15%
|-
|style="background-color:#3B9EDF"|
|align=left|Yevgeny Chivilikhin
|align=left|Fatherland – All Russia
|54,534
|18.51%
|-
|style="background-color: "|
|align=left|Galina Khovanskaya
|align=left|Yabloko
|46,774
|15.88%
|-
|style="background-color: "|
|align=left|Yury Sulyanov
|align=left|Communist Party
|26,438
|8.98%
|-
|style="background-color: #FF4400"|
|align=left|Yury Polyakov
|align=left|Andrey Nikolayev and Svyatoslav Fyodorov Bloc
|16,243
|5.51%
|-
|style="background-color: "|
|align=left|Vladimir Ivanov
|align=left|Independent
|14,476
|4.91%
|-
|style="background-color: #D50000"|
|align=left|Vladimir Milovanov
|align=left|Communists and Workers of Russia - for the Soviet Union
|5,954
|2.02%
|-
|style="background-color: #C21022"|
|align=left|Lyudmila Sedova
|align=left|Party of Pensioners
|5,555
|1.89%
|-
|style="background-color: #020266"|
|align=left|Liliya Pogodina
|align=left|Russian Socialist Party
|4,720
|1.60%
|-
|style="background-color: "|
|align=left|Vladlen Gotsiridze
|align=left|Independent
|4,593
|1.56%
|-
|style="background-color: "|
|align=left|Boris Shpilev
|align=left|Independent
|4,071
|1.38%
|-
|style="background-color: "|
|align=left|Sergey Prokuda
|align=left|Independent
|2,328
|0.79%
|-
|style="background-color: "|
|align=left|Viktor Suvorin
|align=left|Independent
|2,202
|0.75%
|-
|style="background-color:#000000"|
|colspan=2 |against all
|42,416
|14.40%
|-
| colspan="5" style="background-color:#E9E9E9;"|
|- style="font-weight:bold"
| colspan="3" style="text-align:left;" | Total
| 294,556
| 100%
|-
| colspan="5" style="background-color:#E9E9E9;"|
|- style="font-weight:bold"
| colspan="4" |Source:
|
|}

2003

|-
! colspan=2 style="background-color:#E9E9E9;text-align:left;vertical-align:top;" |Candidate
! style="background-color:#E9E9E9;text-align:left;vertical-align:top;" |Party
! style="background-color:#E9E9E9;text-align:right;" |Votes
! style="background-color:#E9E9E9;text-align:right;" |%
|-
|style="background-color: "|
|align=left|Galina Khovanskaya
|align=left|Yabloko
|87,090
|29.59%
|-
|style="background-color: "|
|align=left|Vladimir Lysenko (incumbent)
|align=left|Independent
|74,119
|25.18%
|-
|style="background-color: "|
|align=left|Vladimir Ulas
|align=left|Communist Party
|34,289
|11.65%
|-
|style="background-color: #164C8C"|
|align=left|Yevgeny Gromov
|align=left|United Russian Party Rus'
|14,891
|5.06%
|-
|style="background-color: #00A1FF"|
|align=left|Viktor Arkhipov
|align=left|Party of Russia's Rebirth-Russian Party of Life
|9,842
|3.34%
|-
|style="background-color: " |
|align=left|Andrey Svintsov
|align=left|Liberal Democratic Party
|7,376
|2.51%
|-
|style="background-color: "|
|align=left|Oleg Gabrusev
|align=left|Independent
|3,629
|1.23%
|-
|style="background-color:#000000"|
|colspan=2 |against all
|57,066
|19.39%
|-
| colspan="5" style="background-color:#E9E9E9;"|
|- style="font-weight:bold"
| colspan="3" style="text-align:left;" | Total
| 295,869
| 100%
|-
| colspan="5" style="background-color:#E9E9E9;"|
|- style="font-weight:bold"
| colspan="4" |Source:
|
|}

2016

|-
! colspan=2 style="background-color:#E9E9E9;text-align:left;vertical-align:top;" |Candidate
! style="background-color:#E9E9E9;text-align:left;vertical-align:top;" |Party
! style="background-color:#E9E9E9;text-align:right;" |Votes
! style="background-color:#E9E9E9;text-align:right;" |%
|-
|style="background-color:"|
|align=left|Galina Khovanskaya
|align=left|A Just Russia
|52,623
|31.09%
|-
|style="background-color:"|
|align=left|Yulia Galyamina
|align=left|Yabloko
|23,684
|13.99%
|-
|style="background-color:"|
|align=left|Vasily Vlasov
|align=left|Liberal Democratic Party
|20,306
|11.99%
|-
|style="background-color:"|
|align=left|Anton Tarasov
|align=left|Communist Party
|20,134
|11.89%
|-
|style="background-color:"|
|align=left|Valery Kalachev
|align=left|Rodina
|10,214
|6.03%
|-
|style="background-color:"|
|align=left|Andrey Nechaev
|align=left|Party of Growth
|9,628
|5.69%
|-
|style="background:"| 
|align=left|Ivan Onishchenko
|align=left|Patriots of Russia
|5,981
|3.53%
|-
|style="background:"|
|align=left|Vyacheslav Makarov
|align=left|People's Freedom Party
|5,468
|3.23%
|-
|style="background:"| 
|align=left|Fyodor Obyedkov
|align=left|The Greens
|4,350
|2.57%
|-
|style="background:#E62020;"| 
|align=left|Vitaly Shunkov
|align=left|Communists of Russia
|4,315
|2.55%
|-
|style="background:#00A650;"| 
|align=left|Aleksandr Gus'kov
|align=left|Civilian Power
|2,464
|1.46%
|-
|style="background:"|
|align=left|Yury Yurchenko
|align=left|Civic Platform
|1,839
|1.09%
|-
| colspan="5" style="background-color:#E9E9E9;"|
|- style="font-weight:bold"
| colspan="3" style="text-align:left;" | Total
| 169,287
| 100%
|-
| colspan="5" style="background-color:#E9E9E9;"|
|- style="font-weight:bold"
| colspan="4" |Source:
|
|}

2021

|-
! colspan=2 style="background-color:#E9E9E9;text-align:left;vertical-align:top;" |Candidate
! style="background-color:#E9E9E9;text-align:left;vertical-align:top;" |Party
! style="background-color:#E9E9E9;text-align:right;" |Votes
! style="background-color:#E9E9E9;text-align:right;" |%
|-
|style="background-color: " |
|align=left|Galina Khovanskaya (incumbent)
|align=left|A Just Russia — For Truth
|68,959
|28.78%
|-
|style="background-color: " |
|align=left|Anastasia Bryukhanova
|align=left|Independent
|55,764
|23.28%
|-
|style="background-color: " |
|align=left|Pyotr Zvyagintsev
|align=left|Communist Party
|27,586
|11.51%
|-
|style="background-color: " |
|align=left|Marina Litvinovich
|align=left|Yabloko
|18,270
|7.63%
|-
|style="background-color: "|
|align=left|Sangadzhi Tarbaev
|align=left|New People
|12,824
|5.35%
|-
|style="background-color: " |
|align=left|Vasily Vlasov
|align=left|Liberal Democratic Party
|12,243
|5.11%
|-
|style="background: ;"| 
|align=left|Zoya Andrianova
|align=left|The Greens
|10,035
|4.19%
|-
|style="background-color: "|
|align=left|Viktor Kataev
|align=left|Russian Party of Freedom and Justice
|8,758
|3.66%
|-
|style="background-color: " |
|align=left|Aleksey Balabutkin
|align=left|Communists of Russia
|7,732
|3.23%
|-
|style="background-color: " |
|align=left|Aleksey Melnikov
|align=left|Independent
|7,458
|3.11%
|-
|style="background: ;"| 
|align=left|Alisa Goluenko
|align=left|Green Alternative
|3,368
|1.41%
|-
| colspan="5" style="background-color:#E9E9E9;"|
|- style="font-weight:bold"
| colspan="3" style="text-align:left;" | Total
| 239,587
| 100%
|-
| colspan="5" style="background-color:#E9E9E9;"|
|- style="font-weight:bold"
| colspan="4" |Source:
|
|}

Notes

Sources
198. Ленинградский одномандатный избирательный округ

References

Russian legislative constituencies
Politics of Moscow